"Together" is the fourth single from the album Dying for a Heart by Krystal Meyers. Released in 2006, the song charted at No. 28 on the Christian CHR chart and No. 23 on the Christian Rock chart.

About "Together"
"Together" was used in the hour-long special airing before the third season's premiere of NBC's hit drama, Heroes.

References

External links
  Krystal Meyers - Dying For A Heart (2006, CD) on Discogs

2006 singles
Krystal Meyers songs
Songs written by Krystal Meyers
Essential Records (Christian) singles
2005 songs
Song recordings produced by Ian Eskelin